Ammannia is a genus of around 100 species of plants often referred to as redstems from wet areas in America, Africa, Asia, Australia and Europe. Several species are grown as decorative plants in aquariums.

The genus was named (but not published) by William Houstoun and later published by Linnaeus, who later indicated that the name honored Paul Amman. However, Philip Miller, who received Houstoun's manuscripts on Houston's death, stated that it honored Johann Amman.

Species
, Plants of the World Online accepts 107 species:

References

 
Lythraceae genera